Merveille Fundambu (born 13 November 1999) is a Congolese former professional footballer who played as a midfielder.

Club career

Early career
Fundambu began his career in his native Democratic Republic of the Congo, playing for Iseka, Elonga and Etanchéité.

Weszło Warsaw
On 18 May 2019, he joined Polish Klasa B side Weszło Warsaw. On 19 May 2019, he made his debut in a 5–0 victory over AP Brychczy Warsaw, and scored his first goal for the club. On 14 August 2019, he made his debut in the Masovian Polish Cup, in a match against Bednarska Warsaw with a goal scored (resulting in a 11–2 victory).

Radomiak Radom
On 8 January 2020, he was loaned to I liga side Radomiak Radom. On March 2, Fundambu made his I liga debut, coming on as a substitute for Leândro in a 3–0 defeat against Warta Poznań. He played in 10 games, including the 2019–20 I liga promotion play-off against Warta Poznań (0–2). His loan expired in August 2020.

RTS Widzew Łódź
On 21 August 2020, he joined I liga side Widzew Łódź on a free transfer. He made his debut on 29 August 2020 in a I liga match against his former club Radomiak Radom, playing 69 minutes as Widzew lost 1–4. On 19 September 2020, he scored his first I liga goal in a Widzew's 2–0 victory over Stomil Olsztyn. On 25 November 2020, he made his Polish Cup debut, in a 1–0 home defeat to Legia Warsaw. After regular performances in the autumn and winter of 2020, Fundambu unexpectedly dropped out of the squad and played only one match in 2021, the last 9 minutes of the 3–0 loss against Zagłębie Sosnowiec. His contract expired after the 2020–21 season.

Stomil Olsztyn
On 6 July 2021, it was announced that Fundambu had signed a one-year contract with Stomil Olsztyn. In his debut on 1 August 2021, in a I liga match against Chrobry Głogów, he scored his first goal, but did not save the club from a 2–1 defeat.

End of career 
In the summer of 2022, he retired from professional football and moved to Belgium.

Career statistics

References

External links
 
 

Living people
1999 births
Association football midfielders
Democratic Republic of the Congo footballers
Footballers from Kinshasa
I liga players
KTS Weszło Warsaw players
Radomiak Radom players
Widzew Łódź players
OKS Stomil Olsztyn players
Democratic Republic of the Congo expatriate footballers
Expatriate footballers in Poland
Democratic Republic of the Congo expatriate sportspeople in Poland